is a genre of film, television, video game, and theatre in Japan. Literally meaning "period dramas", they are most often set during the Edo period of Japanese history, from 1603 to 1868.  Some are set much earlier—Portrait of Hell, for example, is set during the late Heian period—and the early Meiji era is also a popular setting. 

Jidaigeki show the lives of the samurai, farmers, craftsmen, and merchants of their time. Jidaigeki films are sometimes referred to as chambara movies, a word meaning "sword fight", though chambara is more accurately a subgenre of jidaigeki. Jidaigeki rely on an established set of dramatic conventions including the use of makeup, language, catchphrases, and plotlines.

Types

Many jidaigeki take place in Edo, the military capital. Others show the adventures of people wandering from place to place. The long-running television series Zenigata Heiji and Abarenbō Shōgun typify the Edo jidaigeki. Mito Kōmon, the fictitious story of the travels of the historical daimyō Tokugawa Mitsukuni, and the Zatoichi movies and television series, exemplify the traveling style.

Another way to categorize jidaigeki is according to the social status of the principal characters. The title character of Abarenbō Shōgun is Tokugawa Yoshimune, the eighth Tokugawa shōgun. The head of the samurai class, Yoshimune assumes the disguise of a low-ranking hatamoto, a samurai in the service of the shogun. Similarly, Mito Kōmon is the retired vice-shogun, masquerading as a merchant. 

In contrast, the coin-throwing Heiji of Zenigata Heiji is a commoner, working for the police, while Ichi (the title character of Zatoichi), a blind masseur, is an outcast, as were many disabled people in that era. In fact, masseurs, who typically were at the bottom of the professional food chain, was one of the few vocational positions available to the blind in that era. Gokenin Zankurō is a samurai but, due to his low rank and income, he has to work extra jobs that higher-ranking samurai were unaccustomed to doing.

Whether the lead role is samurai or commoner, jidaigeki usually reach a climax in an immense sword fight just before the end. The title character of a series always wins, whether using a sword or a jutte (the device police used to trap, and sometimes to bend or break, an opponent's sword).

Roles
Among the characters in jidaigeki are a parade of people with occupations unfamiliar to modern Japanese and especially to foreigners. Here are a few:

Warriors

The warrior class included samurai, hereditary members in the military service of a daimyō or the shōgun, who was a samurai himself. Rōnin, samurai without masters, were also warriors, and like samurai, wore two swords, but they were without inherited employment or status. Bugeisha were men, or in some stories women, who aimed to perfect their martial arts, often by traveling throughout the country. Ninja were the secret service, specializing in stealth, the use of disguises, explosives, and concealed weapons.

Craftsmen
Craftsmen in jidaigeki included metalworkers (often abducted to mint counterfeit coins), bucket-makers, carpenters and plasterers, and makers of woodblock prints for art or newspapers.

Merchants
In addition to the owners of businesses large and small, the jidaigeki often portray the employees. The bantō was a high-ranking employee of a merchant, the tedai, a lower helper. Many merchants employed children, or kozō. Itinerant merchants included the organized medicine-sellers, vegetable-growers from outside the city, and peddlers at fairs outside temples and shrines. In contrast, the great brokers in rice, lumber and other commodities operated sprawling shops in the city.

Governments
In the highest ranks of the shogunate were the rojū. Below them were the wakadoshiyori, then the various bugyō or administrators, including the jisha bugyō (who administered temples and shrines), the kanjō bugyō (in charge of finances) and the two Edo machi bugyō. These last alternated by month as chief administrator of the city. Their role encompassed mayor, chief of police, and judge, and jury in criminal and civil matters.

The machi bugyō oversaw the police and fire departments. (Historically, such people were irregulars and were called to service only when necessary.) The police lived in barracks at Hatchōbori in Edo. They manned ban'ya, the watch-houses, throughout the metropolis.

A separate police force handled matters involving samurai. The ōmetsuke were high-ranking officials in the shogunate; the metsuke and kachi-metsuke, lower-ranking police who could detain samurai. Yet another police force investigated arson-robberies, while Shinto shrines and Buddhist temples fell under the control of another authority. The feudal nature of Japan made these matters delicate, and jurisdictional disputes are common in jidaigeki.

Edo had three fire departments. The daimyō-bikeshi were in the service of designated daimyōs; the jōbikeshi reported to the shogunate; while the machi-bikeshi, beginning under Yoshimune, were commoners under the administration of the machi-bugyō. Thus, even the fire companies have turf wars in the jidaigeki.

Each daimyō maintained a residence in Edo, where he lived during sankin-kōtai. His wife and children remained there even while he was away from Edo, and the ladies-in-waiting often feature prominently in jidaigeki. A high-ranking samurai, the Edo-garō, oversaw the affairs in the daimyōs absence. In addition to a staff of samurai, the household included ashigaru (lightly armed warrior-servants) and chūgen and yakko (servants often portrayed as flamboyant and crooked). Many daimyōs employed doctors, goten'i; their counterpart in the shogun's household was the okuishi. Count on them to provide the poisons that kill and the potions that heal.

Other
The cast of a wandering jidaigeki encountered a similar setting in each han. There, the karō were the kuni-garō and the jōdai-garō. Tensions between them have provided plots for many stories.

Conventions

There are several dramatic conventions of jidaigeki:

The heroes often wear eye makeup, and the villains often have disarranged hair.
A contrived form of old-fashioned Japanese speech, using modern pronunciation and grammar with a high degree of formality and frequent archaisms.
In long-running TV series, like Mito Kōmon and Zenigata Heiji, the lead and supporting actors sometimes change. This is done without any rationale for the change of appearance. The new actor simply appears in the place of the old one and the stories continue. This is similar to the James Bond film series or superhero films, in contrast with e.g. the British television program Doctor Who.
In a sword fight, when a large number of villains attacks the main character, they never attack at once. The main character first launches into a lengthy preamble detailing the crimes the villains have committed, at the end of which the villains then initiate hostilities. The villains charge singly or in pairs; the rest wait their turn to be dispatched and surround the main character until it is their turn to be easily defeated. Sword fights are the grand finale of the show and are conducted to specially crafted theme music for their duration.
On television, even fatal sword cuts draw little blood, and often do not even cut through clothing. Villains are chopped down with deadly, yet completely invisible, sword blows. Despite this, blood or wounding may be shown for arrow wounds or knife cuts.
In chambara films, the violence is generally considerably stylized, sometimes to such a degree that sword cuts cause geysers of blood from wounds. Dismemberment and decapitation are common as well.

Proverbs and catchphrases
Authors of jidaigeki work pithy sayings into the dialog. Here are a few:

 : Like bugs that fly into the fire in the summer (they will come to their destruction)
 : A wolf in sheep's clothing (literally, a parasite in the lion's body)
 : Fires and brawls are the flower of Edo
 : "The eight hundred neighborhoods of Edo"
 : "On the road you need a companion"

The authors of series invent their own catchphrases called  that the protagonist says at the same point in nearly every episode. In Mito Kōmon, in which the eponymous character disguises himself as a commoner, in the final sword fight, a sidekick invariably holds up an accessory bearing the shogunal crest and shouts, : "Back! Can you not see this emblem?", revealing the identity of the hitherto unsuspected old man with a goatee beard. The villains then instantly surrender and beg forgiveness. 

Likewise, Tōyama no Kin-san bares his tattooed shoulder and snarls, : "I won't let you say you forgot this cherry-blossom blizzard!" After sentencing the criminals, he proclaims, : "Case closed."

Examples

Films

Video games
The following are Japanese video games in the jidaigeki genre.

 Downtown Special: Kunio-kun no Jidaigeki dayo Zen'in Shūgō—sequel to Downtown Nekketsu Monogatari (River City Ransom in America) set in feudal Japan.
Genji: Dawn of the Samurai
Hakuōki series
Kengo series
Live A Live in the "Twilight of Edo Japan" scenario
Ni-Oh series
Ninja Gaiden series  "Ninja Ryukenden", "Legend of the Ninja Dragon Sword" in Japan
Nobunaga's Ambition series "Nobunaga no Yabō" in Japan
Onimusha series
Ryū ga Gotoku Kenzan!
Ryū ga Gotoku Ishin!
Samurai, a Sega arcade action game released in March 1980.
Samurai Shodown series
Samurai Warriors  "Sengoku Musō" in Japan 
Samurai Warriors 2  "Sengoku Musō 2" in Japan 
Samurai Warriors 3  "Sengoku Musō 3" in Japan 
Samurai Warriors 4  "Sengoku Musō 4" in Japan 
Samurai Warriors 2: Empires series  "Sengoku Musō 2: Empires" in Japan 
Samurai Warriors: Chronicles  "Sengoku Musō: Kuronikuru" in Japan 
Samurai Warriors: Katana  "Sengoku Musō: Katana" in Japan 
Samurai Warriors: Spirit of Sanada  "Sengoku Musō: Sanada Maru" in Japan 
Sekiro: Shadows Die Twice
Sengoku Ace
Soul of the Samurai
Tenchu series
The Last Blade series
Warriors Orochi series
Way of the Samurai series

Although jidaigeki is essentially a Japanese genre, there are also Western games that use the setting to match the same standards. Examples are Ghost of Tsushima, Shogun: Total War series or Japanese campaigns of Age of Empires III.

Anime and manga
Azumi
Basilisk
Dororo
Fire Tripper
Gintama
Hakuouki Shinsengumi Kitan
Hyouge Mono
Intrigue in the Bakumatsu – Irohanihoheto
InuYasha
Kaze Hikaru
Lone Wolf and Cub
Mushishi
Ninja Scroll
Oi! Ryoma
Otogizoshi
Princess Mononoke
Rakudai Ninja Rantarō
Rurouni Kenshin
Samurai 7
Samurai Champloo
Samurai Executioner
Shigurui
Shōnen Onmyōji
The Yagyu Ninja Scrolls
Samurai Deeper Kyo
Sword of the Stranger
Vagabond
Yasuke

Live action television

 Taiga drama Series on NHK.

Prominent directors
Names are in Western order, with the surname after the given name.

 Hideo Gosha
 Kon Ichikawa
 Hiroshi Inagaki
 Akira Kurosawa
 Masaki Kobayashi
 Shozo Makino
 Kenji Misumi
 Kenji Mizoguchi
 Kihachi Okamoto
 Kimiyoshi Yasuda
 Akira Inoue
 Tomu Uchida
Eiichi Kudo
Tokuzō Tanaka
Koreyoshi Kurahara
Kazuo Ikehiro

Prominent actors

 Tsumasaburō Bandō 
 Denjirō Ōkōchi  
 Chiyonosuke Azuma  
 Utaemon Ichikawa  
 Ryūtarō Ōtomo
 Kanjūrō Arashi
 Jūshirō Konoe
 Ryūnosuke Tsukigata
 Chiezō Kataoka
 Ichikawa Raizō VIII
 Hashizo Okawa
 Yorozuya Kinnosuke
 Toshiro Mifune
 Shintaro Katsu
 Tomisaburo Wakayama
 Kōtarō Satomi
 Asahi Kurizuka
 Hiroki Matsukata
 Masakazu Tamura
 Kin'ya Kitaōji
 Sonny Chiba
 Hideki Takahashi
 Ken Matsudaira

Influence
Star Wars creator George Lucas has admitted to being inspired significantly by the period works of Akira Kurosawa, and many thematic elements found in Star Wars bear the influence of Chanbara filmmaking. In an interview, Lucas has specifically cited the fact that he became acquainted with the term jidaigeki while in Japan, and it is widely assumed that he took inspiration for the term Jedi from this.

References

External links
 A Man, a Blade, an Empty Road: Postwar Samurai Film to 1970 by Allen White, this article discusses specific chanbara films, their distinction from regular jidai-geki, and the evolution of the genre.
  Program for a jidaigeki film series sponsored by the Yale CEAS and the National Film Archive of Japan.
 TOEI KYOTO STUDIO PARK

 
Film genres
Japanese entertainment terms
Japan in fiction